A puy or pui was a society, often organised as a guild or confraternity, sometimes along religious (Catholic) lines, for the patronisation of music and poetry, typically through the holding of competitions. The term puy derives from the Latin podium, meaning "a place to stand", referring probably to a raised platform from which either the contests delivered their works or the judges listened to them. Puys were established in many cities in northern and central France, the Low Countries, and even England during the High Middle Ages and the Renaissance, usually encouraging composition in the Old French language, but also in Latin and Occitan.

The typical puy was dedicated to the Virgin Mary. Membership was regulated by statutes to which those entering had to swear. These governed the election of executive positions within the puy and the benefits inhering in members. Members could be clerical or lay, male or female, noble or bourgeois, urban or rural. The earliest societies were organised around para-liturgical celebrations of the Marian feast days, but these evolved poetry competitions and eventually the competitions became the focus of the festivals. Music and sung performance were emphasised early on, but over the centuries the quality of the poetry came to dominate the members' concern and the puys of Normandy, especially popular from the fifteenth century on, were redefined in the seventeenth as literary academies. In this form they survived until the French Revolution.

A poetical society known, in a generic fashion, as the Puy Sainta Maria (Puy-Sainte-Marie), seems to have held contests at Le-Puy-en-Velay (Podium Aniciense) in the Occitan language under the patronage of Alfonso II of Aragon (1162–96). Among the troubadours known to have competed was the Monge de Montaudon, who received a Eurasian sparrowhawk as a prize for one piece. He is said by his vida to have held the "suzerainty" of the "court of Puy" (cour du Puy) until it was dissolved.

The height of the French puys was in the Late Middle Ages. The puy would have an open invitation for competitions in several categories, with the theme, form, and refrain in each category stipulated. Among the common most common forms were the formes fixes, the chant royal, jeu parti, serventois, and ballade. The music was generally strophic monophony, but the puy at Évreux, founded in 1570, did accept two submissions of through-composed polyphony from Orlande de Lassus. The problems of adjudication at the contests spurred the production of several treatises on versification in the fifteenth and sixteenth centuries. As in the Floral Games celebrated in southern France and Spain, the prizes awarded by the puys could be flowers, such as lilies or roses, or sometimes palms. These floral prizes could be redeemable for money. Besides these, the puys sometimes bestowed signet rings (engraved with imagery or poetry). The puys could attract professionals and men of fame, such as Jean Froissart, who competed and won at Abbeville, Lille, Tournai, and Valenciennes. They also attracted local amateurs.

Known puys
Confrérie de Notre-Dame du Puy d'Abbeville
Confrérie de Notre-Dame du Puy d'Amiens
Puy d'Arras
Puy de Beauvais
Puy de la Conception de Caen
Puy de Dieppe
Confrérie de Notre-Dame du Puy de Douai
Puy de Sainte-Cécile d'Évreux
Puy de Lille
Puy of London
Puy de Paris
Puy de Rouen
Puy de Tournai
Confrérie de Notre-Dame du Puy de Valenciennes

Notes

Confraternities
Medieval French literature
Medieval music genres
Poetry organizations